Pogonogenys masoni is a moth in the family Crambidae. It was described by Eugene G. Munroe in 1961. It has been recorded in the United States of America in the state of California.

References

Moths described in 1961
Odontiini